Fusinus laviniae is a species of sea snail, a marine gastropod mollusc in the family Fasciolariidae, the spindle snails, the tulip snails and their allies.

Description
The length of the shell attains 114.5 mm.

Distribution
This marine species occurs off New Caledonia.

References

laviniae
Gastropods described in 2006